Danville High School (DHS) is a public high school located in Danville, Illinois, United States. It is part of Danville District 118, which also includes two middle schools and eight elementary schools.

The school is perhaps best known for four of its alumni who went on to success in acting: Gene Hackman, Ned Luke, the brothers Dick and Jerry Van Dyke, Donald O'Connor; and one who became an important figure in popularizing early twentieth-century popular music, Bobby Short.

History

Principals
Charlotte "Tracy" Cherry, the current principal of Danville High School, is the school's 33nd principal since 1870.

Academics
For the graduating class of 2016, DHS had an average composite ACT score of 17.6, and graduated 69.7% of its senior class.

In September 2009 the school hosted several education administrators from Taiwan who were visiting to not only see how the school functions, but to participate in a learning opportunity for the school's Global House.

School activities

Activities
The school offers approximately 30 clubs and activities ranging from service-oriented clubs to academic competition, to art appreciation. Among the clubs which are chapters for more national organizations are Key Club, and National Honor Society.

The choral music program supports a choir, show choir, and madrigal program.

The instrumental music program supports two symphonic bands, a pep band (the Maroon Maniacs), percussion ensemble, jazz ensemble, madrigal brass band, marching band (Band of Vikings), a jazz combo (The Tenth Degree), madrigal strings, string orchestra and a symphony orchestra.

In 2021 the school staged the musical Buy Buy Birdie, which (at its 1958 Broadway premier) had starred alum Dick Van Dyke in the role of Albert Peterson. For the 2004 production, Van Dyke returned to the school, and learned one of the numbers ("Put On a Happy Face") alongside the students, performing both nights of the show. Van Dyke, who joined the military before receiving his diploma, was also granted his high school diploma at a ceremony.

Athletics
DHS competes in the Big Twelve conference and is a member of the Illinois High School Association (IHSA); the organization which organizes most interscholastic high school sports and competitive activities in the state of Illinois. Teams are stylized as the Vikings (or Lady Vikings for women's teams).

The school sponsors interscholastic teams for young men and women in basketball, cross country, soccer, swimming & diving, tennis, and track & field. Young men may participate in baseball, football, golf, and wrestling, while young women may compete in cheerleading and softball. While not sponsored by the IHSA, the Athletic Department also sponsors a poms team (Pompettes).

The following teams finished in the top four of their respective IHSA sponsored state championship tournament or meet:

 Basketball (boys): 3rd place (1970–71, 1992–93); 2nd place (1935–36, 1949–50)
 Football: 2nd place (1976–77); semifinals (1978-1979) (2009–10); semifinals (2010–2011)
 Golf (boys): 4th place (1938–39); State Champions (1981–82)
 Swimming & Diving (boys): 3rd place (1939–40, 1940–41)
 Tennis (boys): 4th place (1952–53, 1958–59, 1966–67); 3rd place (1946–47, 1947–48, 2002–03); 2nd place (1951–52, 1959–60); State Champions (1945–46, 1953–54)
 Track & field (boys): 3rd place (1983–84, 1989–90); State Champions (1924–25)
 JROTC drill (Chicago): 2nd place

Traditions

The school has two songs: a fight song and a cheer song. The cheer song's lyrics were borrowed from the cheer song written for Illinois Wesleyan University, substituting "Danville High" for "Wesleyan" and "maroon" for "green".

The school claims no knowledge as to why the school colors were chosen, though they date to at least 1906. The school's teams were originally stylized as the "Maroons". The school's teams briefly used the name "Silver Streaks" before adopting "Vikings" in 1960. While the Vikings name stuck, an attempt to change the school's primary color from maroon to light blue failed to catch on.

Dress Code

As of the 2017-2018 school year, Danville District 118 had revised their old dress code into a new dress code that lets students dress freely as long as it is not vulgar or explicit.

Notable alumni
 Jason Anderson, former Major League Baseball relief pitcher (2003–05)
 Irving Azoff, personal manager to several notable musical talents; former head of MCA Records; producer of several films (Fast Times at Ridgemont High); Chairman of Ticketmaster
 Kenneth D. Bailey, major in the United States Marine Corps; posthumously awarded the Medal of Honor for his actions at Matanikau River during the Battle of Guadalcanal in 1942; namesake of destroyer USS Kenneth D. Bailey
 William B. Black, member of the Illinois House of Representatives (1986–2010)
 Keon Clark, former NBA basketball player (1998–2004); selected in the first round of the 1998 NBA Draft
 Laurie Perry Cookingham (1896–1992), city manager of multiple cities, including Kansas City, Missouri and Fort Worth, Texas
 Gene Hackman, Academy Award-winning actor, best known for his work in film (The French Connection, Unforgiven)
 Ned Luke, actor, Grand Theft Auto V
 Justin March-Lillard, NFL linebacker
 Greg Meidel, television producer
 John P. Meyer, Illinois state legislator and judge
 Donald O'Connor, Emmy Award-winning actor and dancer, perhaps best known for his role in the film Singin' in the Rain
 Bill Putnam, audio engineer, songwriter, producer, studio designer and businessman, who has been described as "the father of modern recording"

 Scott Shaw, photojournalist; received the 1988 Pulitzer Prize for spot news photography
 Trent Sherfield, wide receiver for the Miami Dolphins
 Bobby Short, singer and musician known for his interpretations of early 20th-century American music, and for promoting the compositions of African American composers
 Sterling Slaughter, former MLB player (Chicago Cubs)
 John W. Speakman, Illinois state legislator and lawyer
 Matthew Stover, science fiction and fantasy author of Heroes Die and novels set in the Star Wars universe, including Revenge of the Sith
 Joseph R. Tanner, former NASA astronaut; flew into space four times as a mission specialist where he performed work on the Hubble Space Telescope and International Space Station
 Edward R. Telling, Chairman and CEO of Sears, Roebuck and Company (1978–85)
 Dick Van Dyke, Emmy and Tony award-winning actor; was in the original Broadway cast of Bye Bye Birdie; worked in film (Mary Poppins) and television (The Dick Van Dyke Show, Diagnosis: Murder)
 Jerry Van Dyke, actor and musician best known for his work on television (My Mother the Car, Coach)
 Reg Weaver, former president of the National Education Association; vice president for Education International

References

Bibliography

External links
 Danville High School

Public high schools in Illinois
Danville High School
Buildings and structures in Danville, Illinois
1870 establishments in Illinois
educational institutions established in 1870